Sports Report is one of the longest-running programmes on British radio, and is the world's longest-running sports radio programme. It started on 3 January 1948, and has always been broadcast from 17:00 on Saturday evenings during the football season, for most of its history featuring two readings of the classified football results, although the length of the programme has varied in more recent times depending on whether the BBC has a commentary of a 17:30 Premier League match.

Originally produced by Angus Mackay, it was broadcast on the BBC Light Programme until 25 April 1964. On 22 August 1964 it became part of Sports Service and moved to Network Three (which later became BBC Radio 3) where it initially started at the earlier time of 16:42. On 4 April 1970, however, it moved back to what had by then become BBC Radio 2, where it remained until 25 August 1990 as part of Sport on 2. From 1 September 1990 to 26 March 1994 it moved to the original BBC Radio 5, and since 2 April 1994 it has been broadcast on BBC Radio 5 Live as part of 5 Live Sport.

The start of the 2022–23 English football season saw the axing of the Saturday afternoon classified football results without prior warning or fanfare. This was confirmed on 8 August 2022 when the BBC announced it has dropped the results from the programme because it has been shortened ahead of the 17:30 Premier League match.

Presenters
Raymond Glendenning (1948–53)
Stephen Grenfell (1948–53)
Eamonn Andrews (1950–64)
Robin Marlar (1964–68)
Liam Nolan (1965–66)
Peter Jones (1968–70)
Des Lynam (1970–80)
Mike Ingham (1980–85)
Renton Laidlaw (1985–87)
John Inverdale (1987–94)
Ian Payne (1994–2000)
Mark Pougatch (2000–2016)
Mark Chapman (2016–present)

Classified football results announcers
John Webster (1948–1974)
James Alexander Gordon (1974–2013) 
Charlotte Green (2013–2022)

Theme tune
Extraordinarily, the programme has used the same theme music since its inception - "Out of the Blue", written by Hubert Bath. It is said that Lynam prevented the theme from being dropped in the 1970s due to it sounding old-fashioned.

The use of the closing part of “Out of the Blue” to end the programme was unceremoniously dropped by the BBC without consultation in the mid-2000s.

On Saturday 5 January 2013, Sports Report did not open with "Out of the Blue" for the first time, prompting a string of tweets and presenter Mark Pougatch to tweet shortly afterwards that:

"Out of the Blue" was subsequently played an hour later.

External links

References

BBC Light Programme programmes
BBC Radio 2 programmes
BBC Radio 5 Live programmes
British sports radio programmes
1948 radio programme debuts